Abu'l-Fath Ali ibn Muhammad ibn al-Hussain ibn Yusuf ibn Muhammad ibn Abd al-Aziz al-Busti (Arabic: أبو الفتح علي بن محمد بن الحسين بن يوسف بن محمد بن عَبْد العَزِيز البستي, Persian: ابوالفتح علی بن محمد بن حسین بن یوسف بن محمد بن عبدالعزیز بُستی), more commonly known as Abu'l-Fath al-Busti (Arabic: أبو الفتح البُستي, Persian: ابوالفتح بُستی) was a Persian secretary and famous poet of the Arabic and Persian language. Born in the ancient city Bost (today Lashkargah, Afghanistan) in Sistan, he served in the chancery of the Ghaznavid Amirs Sebuktigin and his son and successor Mahmud.

Abu al-Fath was, amongst others, a student of the well known islamic scholar Ibn Hibban who derives from the same city and from whom he learned the islamic sciences of Hadith and Fiqh.

Life
His family descends from the Arab Abdu-Shams clan of the Quraish tribe, who settled in the area after the islamic advent. In his youth he was the secretary of Bai Toz, the head of his hometown Bust. At the time Sebuktigin conquered the city, Abu Al-Fath was appointed to serve him at his court as an official writer. He maintainted this position under his successor Mahmud. That was the period when most of his official records of the Ghaznavid conquests were made, known as "Kutub al Futuh" (Books of victories), of which only fragments survived.

At the end of his life he experienced many vicissitudes and was exiled to Transoxiana where he died in the city of Bukhara (today part of Uzbekistan).

Works

Qasidah an-Nuniyyah (“Poem in Nun”)

The poem is also known under the title of "Unwan al-Hikam" ("The Title for Wisdoms") and "Ziyadat ul-Mar’i fi-Dunyahi Nuqsan" ("To Rise in One's World Is to Decline"). It is a Qasida which relates to moral aphorisms and akhlaq (good character).

References

940s births
1010 deaths
10th-century Persian-language poets
Abbasid literature
Ghaznavid-period poets
Ghaznavid scholars
Ghaznavid viziers
Persian Arabic-language poets
Poets from the Abbasid Caliphate
Persian-language writers
10th-century Arabic writers